The Anqing Yangtze River Railway Bridge is a cable-stayed bridge opened over the Yangtze River near Anqing, Anhui, China. The bridge will carry two rail tracks on the high speed Nanjing–Anqing Intercity Railway line. The bridge and the new line will cut the rail travel time between Nanjing and Anqing from the eight hours down to just 90 minutes.

Construction
Construction of the bridge began on March 20, 2009, and was completed in December 2015. The total cost of the project was 1.43 billion yuan.

See also
List of largest cable-stayed bridges
Yangtze River bridges and tunnels
List of tallest bridges in the world

References

Bridges in Anhui
Bridges completed in 2015
Cable-stayed bridges in China
Bridges over the Yangtze River
Buildings and structures in Anqing